Al Hilal (Judgement of Allah) is a 1935 Urdu/Hindi costume drama film. It was the debut directorial venture of Mehboob Khan. He went on to become "one of the pioneer directors of Indian Cinema". The film is thought to be inspired by Cecil B. DeMille's The Sign of the Cross. The film was produced by Sagar Movietone. The director of photography was Faredoon Irani. The music composer was Pransukh Nayak with lyrics by Munshi Ehsan Lucknavi. It starred Kumar, Indira, Yakub, Sitara Devi, Kayam Ali and Mehboob Khan. The film depicted fictionalised history in the form of a Roman-Arab conflict, with the son of the Ottoman Empire being captured by the Roman army and his escape from them.

Plot
Set in the Ottoman Empire it deals with the Caesar's (Pande) army and their skirmishes with the local Muslim rulers. The Sultan's (Asooji) son Ziyad (Kumar) is arrested by the Roman army. The Roman princess Rahil falls in love with him. A Muslim maid Leela (Sitara Devi) and the princess help him escape. What follows are long chase scenes and fights which ultimately led to success for Ziyad and his people.

Cast
Kumar
Indira
Yakub
Sitara Devi
Pande
Mehboob Khan
Wallace
Asooji
Razak
Kayam Ali
Azurie

Production
Sets were lavish and extensive use of variations made in camera technique like "tight close-ups" and skilfully captured battle scenes. Through the film Mehboob Khan also showed his expertise in the field of editing.

Reception
The film was a "commercial success" and Mehboob Khan earned "critical acclaim" as a director. According to Rauf Ahmed Baburao Patel of Filmindia declared after watching the debut direction that "He will go far".

Songs

References

External links

1935 films
1930s Hindi-language films
Films directed by Mehboob Khan
Indian drama films
1935 drama films
Indian black-and-white films
Hindi-language drama films
Films set in the Ottoman Empire
Films set in the Byzantine Empire